Nanon may refer to:

 Nanon, Ninon et Maintenon, by Emmanuel Théaulon and Armand d'Artois
 Nanon, an 1877 opera by Genee, based on Théaulon and d'Artois
 Nanon (1924 film), a German silent film
 Nanon (1938 film), a German remake film
 Nanon, an 1872 novel by George Sand
 Nanobacterium, the alleged micro-organism
 559 Nanon, a main-belt asteroid
 Korapat Kirdpan, Thai actor nicknamed Nanon